Samsung R&D Institute India - Bangalore (SRI - Bangalore) earlier known as Samsung Electronics India Software Operations (SISO) is one of the 30 Research & Development centers of Samsung Electronics globally, housed in the IT hub of India, Bangalore. SRI - Bangalore is the largest R&D center of the South Korean conglomerate outside its home country, South Korea.

The organisation has executed close to 300 projects since its formation. SRI-B works with many organisations involved in the field of software and technology in India.

In 2012, the main office was shifted to Bagmane Constellation Business Park near Doddanekkundi, Bangalore.

Divisions
 Advanced Technologies Division
 B2B
 Digital Printing Division
 System LSI Division
 Memory Solutions Division
 Telecom and Network Division
 Wireless Terminals Division
 Android Platform Division
 Samsung Health Care and SmartSchool solutions
 Tizen Platform Division
 CRL

References

India Software Operations
India Software Operations
Companies based in Bangalore
Software companies of India
Indian subsidiaries of foreign companies
Indian companies established in 1996
1996 establishments in Karnataka